Allotinus strigatus is a butterfly in the family Lycaenidae. It was described by Moulton in 1911. It is found in Southeast Asia.

Subspecies
Allotinus strigatus strigatus (Borneo, Pulo Laut)
Allotinus strigatus malayanus Corbet, 1939 (Thailand, Langkawi, Malay Peninsula, Tioman, Singapore)

References

Butterflies described in 1911
Allotinus
Butterflies of Borneo